In spectroscopy, the Rydberg constant, symbol  for 
The constant first arose as an empirical fitting parameter in the Rydberg formula for the hydrogen spectral series, but Niels Bohr later showed that its value could be calculated from more fundamental constants according to his model of the atom. 

In either case, the constant is used to express the limiting value of the highest wavenumber (inverse wavelength) of any photon that can be emitted from a hydrogen atom, or, alternatively, the wavenumber of the lowest-energy photon capable of ionizing a hydrogen atom from its ground state. The hydrogen spectral series can be expressed simply in terms of the Rydberg constant for hydrogen  and the Rydberg formula.

In atomic physics, Rydberg unit of energy, symbol Ry, corresponds to the energy of the photon whose wavenumber is the Rydberg constant, i.e. the ionization energy of the hydrogen atom in a simplified Bohr model.

Value

Rydberg constant  

The CODATA value is

 ,

where
 is the rest mass of the electron (i.e. the Electron mass),
 is the elementary charge, 
 is the permittivity of free space, 
 is the Planck constant, and 
 is the speed of light in vacuum.

The Rydberg constant for hydrogen may be calculated from the reduced mass of the electron:
 

where

  is the mass of the electron,
  is the mass of the nucleus (a proton).

Rydberg unit of energy 
The Rydberg unit of energy is equivalent to joules and electronvolts in the following manner:

Rydberg frequency

Rydberg wavelength 
.

The angular wavelength is

.

Occurrence in Bohr model

The Bohr model explains the atomic spectrum of hydrogen (see hydrogen spectral series) as well as various other atoms and ions. It is not perfectly accurate, but is a remarkably good approximation in many cases, and historically played an important role in the development of quantum mechanics. The Bohr model posits that electrons revolve around the atomic nucleus in a manner analogous to planets revolving around the sun.

In the simplest version of the Bohr model, the mass of the atomic nucleus is considered to be infinite compared to the mass of the electron, so that the center of mass of the system, the barycenter, lies at the center of the nucleus. This infinite mass approximation is what is alluded to with the  subscript. The Bohr model then predicts that the wavelengths of hydrogen atomic transitions are (see Rydberg formula):

where  and M is the total mass of the nucleus. This formula comes from substituting the reduced mass of the electron.

Precision measurement

The Rydberg constant is one of the most precisely determined physical constants, with a relative standard uncertainty of under 2 parts in 1012. This precision constrains the values of the other physical constants that define it.

Since the Bohr model is not perfectly accurate, due to fine structure, hyperfine splitting, and other such effects, the Rydberg constant  cannot be directly measured at very high accuracy from the atomic transition frequencies of hydrogen alone. Instead, the Rydberg constant is inferred from measurements of atomic transition frequencies in three different atoms (hydrogen, deuterium, and antiprotonic helium). Detailed theoretical calculations in the framework of quantum electrodynamics are used to account for the effects of finite nuclear mass, fine structure, hyperfine splitting, and so on.

Alternative expressions
The Rydberg constant can also be expressed as in the following equations.

and in energy units

where
 is the electron rest mass,
 is the electric charge of the electron,
 is the Planck constant,
 is the reduced Planck constant,
 is the speed of light in vacuum,
 is the electrical field constant (permittivity) of free space,
 is the fine-structure constant,
 is the Compton wavelength of the electron,
 is the Compton frequency of the electron,
 is the Compton angular frequency of the electron,
 is the Bohr radius,
 is the classical electron radius.

The last expression in the first equation shows that the wavelength of light needed to ionize a hydrogen atom is 4π/α times the Bohr radius of the atom.

The second equation is relevant because its value is the coefficient for the energy of the atomic orbitals of a hydrogen atom: .

References

Emission spectroscopy
Physical constants
Units of energy